Candy Bauer (born 31 July 1986) is a German bobsledder. He competed in the four-man event at the 2018 Winter Olympics winning the gold medal.

References

External links

Candy Bauer at the German Bobsleigh, Luge, and Skeleton Federation 

1986 births
Living people
German male bobsledders
Olympic bobsledders of Germany
Bobsledders at the 2018 Winter Olympics
Bobsledders at the 2022 Winter Olympics
People from Zschopau
Olympic medalists in bobsleigh
Olympic gold medalists for Germany
Medalists at the 2018 Winter Olympics
Medalists at the 2022 Winter Olympics
Sportspeople from Saxony